The whiptail ctenotus (Ctenotus mastigura)  is a species of skink found in Western Australia.

References

mastigura
Reptiles described in 1975
Taxa named by Glen Milton Storr